Weston, Wisconsin is a village in Marathon County, Wisconsin, United States.

Weston may also refer to the following places in Wisconsin:
Weston, Clark County, Wisconsin, a town in Clark County
Weston, Dunn County, Wisconsin, a town in Dunn County
Weston (community), Dunn County, Wisconsin, an unincorporated community in Dunn County
Weston (town), Marathon County, Wisconsin, a town in Marathon County

See also  
Weston (disambiguation)